Thomas Grant Gustin (born January 14, 1990) is an American actor and singer. He is best known for his roles as Barry Allen / The Flash on The CW series The Flash as part of the Arrowverse, and as Sebastian Smythe on the Fox series Glee.

Early life 
Thomas Grant Gustin was born on January 14, 1990, in Norfolk, Virginia. He is the son of Tina Haney, a pediatric nurse, and Thomas Gustin, a college professor. During his high school years, he attended the Governor's School for the Arts program in Norfolk for musical theater. He also went to Hurrah Players Incorporated which is a theater organization in Virginia. In 2008, he graduated from Granby High School and went on to attend the BFA Music Theater Program at Elon University in North Carolina for two years. He has been a friend of actor Chris Wood since college.

Career 
Gustin's first known screen role came while he was still in high school in the film Rain (2004). In this student film, by director/producer Neil Grochmal, during his studies at Regent University. Gustin plays a young mute who dreams of a man's tragic loss of his wife in a robbery, then later crosses paths with the man, stirring visions that help the man solve the mystery of who murdered his wife. Grochmal said Gustin showed raw talent and figured the youngster would be a future achiever in acting.

Gustin left school to take the role of Baby John in the Broadway Revival Tour of West Side Story, and performed with the tour from its opening on September 30, 2010, through September 23, 2011.

On November 8, 2011, he debuted on the television series Glee as Sebastian Smythe, an openly gay member of the Dalton Academy Warblers. Gustin won the recurring role of Sebastian, a promiscuous and scheming character, after "an exhaustive, weeks-long casting search". He originally auditioned for a background role as a tap dancer, but did not get the part. However, Ryan Murphy kept him in mind. He began filming the role early on Monday, September 26, 2011, after having finished his final West Side Story performance the previous Friday night. In January 2012, Naya Rivera (as her character Santana Lopez) and Gustin (as Smythe) performed "Smooth Criminal" as a duet in the season three episode "Michael", backed by musical duo 2Cellos. The song was filmed in a similar environment as the 2Cellos music video, in a room surrounded by empty chairs as the two musicians play. This cover debuted and peaked at number 26 at Billboard Hot 100, number 10 at Billboard Digital Songs, and number 28 at Billboard Canadian Hot 100 chart at the week of February 18, 2012.

Gustin began filming A Mother's Nightmare, an original film for the Lifetime network, in late May 2012. The project also stars actresses Annabeth Gish and Jessica Lowndes, and was shot in West Kelowna, British Columbia, Canada. On July 11, 2012, it was announced that Gustin had landed a major role in the independent film Affluenza.

On September 13, 2013, it was announced that Gustin would play Barry Allen in the second season of Arrow. He was initially supposed to appear in three episodes, the last one serving as the backdoor pilot for a potential spin-off Flash series. However, the backdoor pilot plan was dropped in favor of a stand-alone pilot, titled The Flash. The pilot was picked up with an initial order of thirteen episodes, and the series premiered on October 7, 2014, with 4.8 million viewers, the most for a premiere on The CW in five years.  the series had concluded its eighth season with 171 episodes aired in total, and was renewed for a ninth and final season on March 22, 2022. As part of the greater Arrowverse, Gustin has reprised his role as Allen on Arrow, Supergirl and Legends of Tomorrow, as well as the web series Vixen.

On March 30, 2016, it was announced that Gustin would star in William H. Macy's film Krystal. The film premiered in 2017 at the Virginia Film Festival, and was released on April 13, 2018, by Great Point Media and Paladin In March 2020, Gustin was cast in Operation Blue Eyes as Barry Keenan.

Personal life 
In January 2016, Gustin began dating Andrea "LA" Thoma after they met at a dinner party. They announced their engagement on April 29, 2017, and they married on December 15, 2018. Their first child, a daughter, was born in 2021.

Filmography

Film

Television

Web

Theater

Discography

Awards and nominations

References

External links 

 
 

1990 births
21st-century American male actors
Actors from Norfolk, Virginia
Actors from Virginia
American male child actors
American male film actors
American male musical theatre actors
American male stage actors
American male television actors
American male voice actors
Elon University alumni
Living people
Male actors from Virginia
Musicians from Norfolk, Virginia